The 1872 Florida gubernatorial election was held on November 5, 1872. Republican nominee Ossian B. Hart defeated the Liberal Republican Party nominee William D. Bloxham.

This election was the last time a Republican won until 1966.

General election

Candidates

Republican 

 Ossian B. Hart

Liberal Republican/Democratic 

 William D. Bloxham

Results

Results by County

See also 

 1872 United States presidential election in Florida
 1872 United States House of Representatives election in Florida

References 

Florida
1872 Florida elections
Florida gubernatorial elections